Carex sect. Spirostachyae is a section of the genus Carex, containing 38 species of sedge. Species in Carex sect. Spirostachyae share a suite of features, including the short internodes of the primary rhizomes, the presence of an antiligule, the leaf-like, sheathing bract at the base of the inflorescence, the presence of three stigmas in female flowers, and the shape of the seeds.

The section is composed of two subsections, with differing edaphic preferences; subsection Elatae comprises species that lives on acidic soils, while those in subsection Spirostachyae live on basic or ultramafic soils. The two sections also differ morphologically, with species in subsection Elatae having wider leaves, thicker stems and larger spikes, the lowest of which may hang downwards.

The centre of diversity of the group is in Europe and adjacent parts of Africa and Asia; a few species occur in Australia, Africa, South America and on oceanic islands. The three species present in North America are introductions.

Subsection Elatae (Kük.) Luceño & M. Escudero
Carex aethiopica Schkuhr – South Africa
Carex binervis Sm. – western Europe
Carex borbonica Lam. – Mascarene Islands
Carex boryana Schkuhr – Mascarene Islands
Carex camposii Boiss. & Reut. – southern Spain
Carex catharinensis Boeck. – southeastern Brazil
Carex clavata Thunb. – South Africa
Carex cyrtosaccus C. B. Clarke – Tanzania, Malawi
Carex elgonensis Nelmes – Mount Elgon
Carex fischeri K. Schum. – central Africa
Carex fissirostris Ball – Atlas Mountains, Morocco
Carex fuscula d'Urv. – Chile, Argentina
Carex gunniana Boot. – southeastern Australia
Carex helodes Link – southern Spain and Portugal, northern Morocco
Carex hochstetteriana J. Gay ex Seub. – Azores
Carex laevigata Sm. – western Europe, Morocco
Carex petitiana A. Rich. – central Africa
Carex lowei Bech. – Madeira
Carex mairii Coss. & Germ. – France, Spain, northern Morocco
Carex mannii E. A. Bruce – central Africa
Carex mildbraediana Kük. – Rwanda, Burundi, Kenya
Carex modesti M.Escudero, Martín-Bravo & Jim.Mejías – Tanzania
Carex paulo-vargasii Luceño & Marín – Morocco
Carex perraudieriana J. Gay – Canary Islands
Carex punctata Gaud. – Europe, Morocco, western Asia
Carex simensis Hochst. ex A. Rich. – central Africa
Carex thouarsii Carmich. – Tristan da Cunha
Carex vallis-rosetto K. Schum. – Kenya, Tanzania

Subsection Spirostachyae
Carex blakei Nelmes – southeastern Australia
Carex burchelliana Boeck. – South Africa
Carex diluta M. Bieb. – central and western Asia
Carex distans L. – Europe, North Africa, central and western Asia
Carex ecklonii Nees – South Africa
Carex extensa Good. – Europe and Mediterranean Basin
Carex idaea Greuter et al. – Crete
Carex lainzii Luceño, E. Rico & T. Romero – central Spain
Carex tasmanica Kük. – Tasmania
Carex troodi Turril – Cyprus
Carex vixdentata (Kük.) G. A. Wheeler – South America

References

Further reading

Carex
Plant sections